

Codes

References

U